Foreign relations between Argentina and Bolivia have existed for over a century. Both countries were part of the Spanish Empire, and share an international border. Both nations are members of the Community of Latin American and Caribbean States, Latin American Integration Association, Organization of American States, Organization of Ibero-American States and the United Nations.

History 
Initially, both modern states of Argentina and Bolivia were part of the Viceroyalty of the Río de la Plata. Buenos Aires was by then the Capital city, and Bolivia was known as the Upper Peru. Buenos Aires ousted the viceroy in 1810, during the May Revolution, one of the starting points of the Spanish American wars of independence. The Upper Peru was heavily disputed during this war, and Buenos Aires sent three ill-fated military campaigns to secure the zone. The royalists in the Upper Peru would be ultimately defeated by Sucre, who came from the North. 

The expansionist incursions of Andrés de Santa Cruz, head of the Peru-Bolivian Confederation, led both countries to war. However, the war was mainly between the Confederation and Chile. Argentina faced instead the French blockade of the Río de la Plata, imposed by France to support Santa Cruz.

Trade and investment

In 2016, Argentine exports to Bolivia amounted to US$559.7 million and Bolivian exports to Argentina amounted to US$708.7 million.

Resident diplomatic missions

of Argentina in Bolivia
 La Paz (Embassy)
 Santa Cruz de la Sierra (Consulate-General)
 Tarija (Consulate-General)
 Cochabamba (Consulate)
 Villazón (Consulate)
 Yacuiba (Consulate)

of Bolivia in Argentina
 Buenos Aires (Embassy)
 Córdoba (Consulate)
 Jujuy (Consulate)
 La Quiaca (Consulate)
 Mendoza (Consulate)
 Orán (Consulate)
 Pocito (Consulate)
 Rosario (Consulate)
 Salta (Consulate)
 Viedma (Consulate)

See also
 Bolivia during the Falklands War
 Bolivian Argentines
 2019 Bolivian political crisis

References

 
Bolivia
Bilateral relations of Bolivia